Home Farm is a historic home located near Leesburg, Loudoun County, Virginia.  The original log section of the house was built about 1757, with a stone addition built about 1810, a frame addition built about 1830, and a frame kitchen addition built about 1930.  It is an "L"-shaped, two-story, single-pile vernacular house clad in wood siding, random rubble fieldstone, and brick veneer laid. The interior exhibits stylistic influences of the Federal style.  Also on the property are a contributing early-20th century henhouse, the stone foundation of a spring house, and a dry-laid fieldstone wall.

It was listed on the National Register of Historic Places in 2007.

In 2019, Home Farm 1760 was established at "Home Farm" specializing in organic locally sourced produce, botanicals, and products.

References

Houses on the National Register of Historic Places in Virginia
Federal architecture in Virginia
Houses completed in 1757
Houses in Loudoun County, Virginia
National Register of Historic Places in Loudoun County, Virginia
Leesburg, Virginia